The German Society for Animal Breeding in German: Deutsche Gesellschaft für Züchtungskunde e.V. (DGfZ) is a specialist association which sees itself as a link in the area of livestock science, in that brings together science, administration and practice (including intermediate areas) over all species of animal.

Mission and Structure
The DGfZ was formed in 1905 as a non-profit organization with its seat in Bonn (Germany). It officially represents Germany at the European Federation of Animal Science (EAAP) and is thus financially sponsored by the Bundesministerium für Ernährung, Landwirtschaft und Verbraucherschutz (Federal Ministry for Nutrition, Agriculture and Consumer Protection)

The official organ of the DGfZ is the journal Züchtungskunde (Breeding Science published by the  Ulmer Verlag. [5] [6][7][8]
In addition, it organises symposia, lectures and workshops at which European research results are discussed and market analysis carried out. [9]

The following working groups are active:
the Genetic-Statistic Committee
the Animal Genetics Advisory Board
the Working Group for Foodstuffs of Animal Origin
the Drafting Committee and the Editorial Staff of the journal Animal Breeding

Students of animal science are supported with stipendia and financial aid. Those who have significantly contributed to the field of animal science and veterinary medicine are honoured with the Hermann-von-Nathusius-Medal, the Adolf-Koeppe-Badge (named after Adolf Koeppe) or with honorary  membership of the DGfZ.[10][11]

Previous Honorary Members
2013 Leo Siebers, Kleve-Rindern
2010 Ernst-Jürgen Lode, Woldegk (honorary president)
2009 Ernst Kalm, Kiel
2007 William Hill, Edinburgh, UK
2006 Heinz-Werner Lehmann, Uelzen
2005 Roland Ulmer, Stuttgart
2004 Franz Schmitten, Bonn
2003 Klaus Meyn, Königswinter
2002 Hermann Trautwein, Nürtingen; Philipp R. Fürst zu Solms-Lich, Lich, as honorary president
2001 Maurice Bichard, Abingdon/Oxon, England
1998 Jan Philipsson, Uppsala (Sweden)
1997 Janos Dohy, Gödöllö (Hungary)
1996 Franc Habe, Ljubljana, (Slovenia)
1994 Jean Boyazoglu, Rom (Italy)
1993 Eberhard Thyssen, Herrsching am Ammersee
1992 Diedrich Richard Osterhoff, Pretoria (Republic of South Africa); Diedrich Schröder, Wilhelminenhof, as honorary president.
1991 Arne Roos, Örkelljunga (Sweden)
1989 Alessandro Nardone, Viterbo (Italy)
1987 Georg Schönmuth, Berlin
1986 Kristòf von Kàllay, Rom (Italy)
1985 Patrick Cunningham, Dublin (Ireland)
1981 Wolfgang von Scharfenberg, Wanfried, as honorary president; Walther Baier, Munich; Robert Winnigstedt, Bonn; G. Hahl; Karl Schimmelpfennig, Oldenburg i.O.; André-Max Leroy, Paris (France); Adolf Köppe, Norden; Johannes Hansen, Berlin; Felix Hoesch; Wilhelm Zorn, Tschechnitz, as honorary chairman; Wilhelm Niklas, München, as honorary president.

External links
 Webpage German Society for Animal Breeding
 List of Honorary Members

References

Agricultural organisations based in Germany
Animal breeding organizations
Scientific organisations based in Germany
Organisations based in Bonn
Agrarian politics
Conservation and environmental foundations
Foundations based in Germany